Blanka Mikysková (born 28 October 1963) is a Czech rower. She competed in the women's quadruple sculls event at the 1988 Summer Olympics.

References

External links
 

1963 births
Living people
Czech female rowers
Olympic rowers of Czechoslovakia
Rowers at the 1988 Summer Olympics
People from Valtice
Sportspeople from the South Moravian Region